George Spence may refer to:

George Spence (Canadian politician) (1880–1975), Canadian provincial and federal politician
George Spence (MP) (1787–1850), Member of Parliament for Ripon, 1829–1832
George Spence (footballer, born 1877) (1877–?), Scottish football player for Preston, Southampton and Hull
George Spence (footballer, born 1904) (1904–?), English football player for Nelson